Simunul, officially the Municipality of Simunul,  is a 4th class municipality in the province of Tawi-Tawi, Philippines. According to the 2020 census, it has a population of 34,245 people.

Geography
The municipality consists of 2 islands: the larger eponymous Simunul Island and Manuk Mangkaw (Manuk Manka) Island,  to the south.

There are six beaches in Simunul. The majority of the people are Muslims.

Barangays
Simunul is politically subdivided into 15 barangays.

The barangays of Timundon, Manuk Mangkaw, and Luuk Datan are located on Manuk Mangkaw Island; the remaining 12 barangays are located on Simunul Island.

Climate

Demographics

The language spoken is Sama, also known as Sinama. The first Muslims in the Philippines are said to have arrived at Simunur. The first mosque in the Philippines was built here by Sheik Karimul Makhdum. This mosque is called the Sheik Karimal Makdum Mosque. Inside this mosque stands 4 hags where it is repainted every year.

Economy

References

External links
 Simunul Profile at PhilAtlas.com
 [ Philippine Standard Geographic Code]
 Simunul Profile at the DTI Cities and Municipalities Competitive Index
 Philippine Census Information

Municipalities of Tawi-Tawi
Island municipalities in the Philippines